is the first novel by Japanese writer Haruki Murakami. It first appeared in the June 1979 issue of Gunzo, and in book form the next month. The novel was adapted by Japanese director Kazuki Ōmori in a 1981 film distributed by Art Theatre Guild. An English translation by Alfred Birnbaum appeared in 1987.

It is the first book in the so-called "Trilogy of the Rat" series of independent novels, followed by Pinball, 1973 (1980) and A Wild Sheep Chase (1982), before the later epilogue Dance Dance Dance (1988). All four books in the series have been translated into English, but Hear the Wind Sing and Pinball, 1973 (which are realist novels slightly differing from the author's later style) were never widely distributed in the English-speaking world, having only been published in Japan by Kodansha under their Kodansha English Library branding (for English Foreign Language learners), and both only as A6-sized pocketbooks. This was due to Murakami viewing the two novels as "works from his immature period". An omnibus English edition of Murakami's first two novels (Hear the Wind Sing and Pinball, 1973), under the title Wind/Pinball, with translations by Prof. Ted Goossen of York University, was released in the United States in August, 2015.

Title
The title "Hear the Wind Sing" came from the last sentence of Truman Capote's short story "Shut a Final Door" - "Think of nothing things, think of wind." However, the title of the novel submitted to the Gunzo Literature Prize committee was "Happy Birthday and White Christmas". The old title appears at the top of the cover page of the published book in small fonts.

Themes
On Apr 1 1978, the author suddenly had the ideas of a story while he was watching an NPB baseball game of Yakult Swallows at Meiji Jingu Stadium. The inspiration struck when the first batter Dave Hilton hit a double in the 1st inning. Murakami was running a Jazz cafe at the time. He took 1 hour each night to write the novel and finished it in 4 months. It was his debut novel. The story takes place in 1970 over a period of nineteen days between August 8 and August 28, and is narrated by a 21-year-old unnamed man. The story contains forty small chapters amounting to 130 pages. The story covers the craft of writing, the Japanese student movement, and, like later Murakami novels, relationships and loss. Like later novels, cooking, eating and drinking, and listening to western music are regularly described. The narrator's close friend 'the Rat', around whom the trilogy of the Rat evolves, is a student and bar patron who expresses a general alienation towards society. The narrator describes the (fictional) American writer Derek Hartfield as a primary influence, citing his pulp science fiction works, and quoting him at several points.

Plot summary
Feeling writing as a terribly painful task, the narrator re-tells the story of his 1970 summer. He was a student at a university in Tokyo then, and returned to his seaside hometown in Kobe for summer vacation. That spring, a girl he dated at the university committed suicide. During the summer vacation, he frequented J's bar with his friend "Rat" and spent much time drinking beer obsessively. One day, he came across a girl lying on the floor in the washroom of the bar and carried her home. The girl had no left little finger. Later, he ran into the girl by chance in the record store where she worked. After that, she started calling him and they hung out a few times. Meanwhile, Rat was clearly troubled about some woman but he did not disclose the details. One day, the girl without a little finger met the narrator at a restaurant near the harbor. They took a walk in the dusk along the warehouse street. She told him, "When I sit there alone, I can hear a lot of people coming to talk to me..." That night, at her apartment, she revealed she just had an abortion. When he came back in the winter, the girl had left the record store and her apartment. The narrator is married now and living in Tokyo. Rat is still writing novels and sends his manuscripts to the narrator every Christmas.

Characters
I
The narrator of the story, born on Dec 24, 1948. (Murakami was born on Jan 12, 1949). "I" was a university student studying biology who returned to his hometown for summer vacation.

Rat
Born in September, he and "I" became friends in "I"'s freshman year and they hung out a lot. He lived in a 3-story house with a greenhouse on the rooftop.

J
Bartender of J's Bar, a Chinese man. "I" once commented that J's Japanese is better than their own.

The girl without a little finger
Born on January 10, she lost her left little finger at the age of 8. She had a twin sister and worked in a record shop.

"I"'s high school classmate girl
She lent "I" a California Girls record in high school, and in the summer of 1970 made a request of the same sone on radio for me. She dropped out of university due to illness in March 1970.

The sick girl
A 17 year old girl who contracted a disease which affected her spinal nerves and had been bedridden for 3 years.

Three uncles
"I"'s first uncle gave them a book written by Derek Hartfield. He died three years later of intestine cancer. Their second uncle stepped on a landmine laid by himself in Shanghai 2 days after the end of World War II. Their third uncle was a traveling magician touring the hot springs around Japan.

Three girls I slept with
The first girl was a classmate and girlfriend in high school; she and the protagonist broke up a few months after graduation. The second was a 16 years old hippie girl "I" met in the Shinjuku subway station; she stayed in their apartment for one week and left. The third was a girl "I" met in the university library who was studying French. In the spring of the next year, she was found to have hung herself in a forest.

DJ of NEB radio station
Host of "Pop Telephone Request" - a 2-hour radio program starting at 7pm every Saturday. Self-claimed as a "stand-up comedian dog". He liked to end his program with "I love you guys."

Derek Hartfield
A writer who wrote a lot of pulp fictions about aliens and monsters. "I" learnt a lot about writing from him. At the time this novel was published, many channels for information like internet were non-existent. Hence many readers assumed Derek Hartfield was a real life author, so much so that many librarians were puzzled in receiving requests of books written by Derek Hartfield.

Awards
 The 22nd Gunzo Prize for New Writers (April 1979)
 The 81st Akutagawa Prize (July 1979) - nominated
 The 1st Noma Literary Newcomer's Prize (Dec 1979) - nominated

Cultural references
Music
 Rainy Night in Georgia
 Who'll Stop the Rain
 California Girls
 Piano Concerto No. 3 (Beethoven)
 Nashville Skyline
 Return to Sender
 Everyday People
 Woodstock (song)
 Spirit in the Sky
 Hey There Lonely Girl
 Good Luck Charm

Others
 Fiat 600
 Richard Burton
 Sentimental Education
 Gimlet
 Roger Vadim
 Jules Michelet
  Triumph TR3
 Convoy
 Mother Joan of the Angels

English Language Editions

References 

1979 Japanese novels
Novels by Haruki Murakami
Fiction set in 1970
Realist novels
Japanese novels adapted into films
1979 debut novels